Danijel Mileta (born 12 January 1975) is a Croatian politician and electrical engineer who has been deputy mayor of Šibenik since 2013.

Early life
Mileta was born in Šibenik where he finished elementary school and naturalistic-mathematical gymnasium. He graduated from the Zagreb Faculty of Electrical Engineering and Computing where he completed his postgraduate scientific studies and gained the professional title of Master of Science. In 2002 he enrolled in postgraduate scientific studies of business economics from organization and management at the Zagreb Faculty of Economics, where he passed all the exams in a regular manner.

Business career
His rich business experience began in 2000 in Hrvatski Telekom as a telecommunications and mobile network specialist and then as an associate for a network strategy and business plan. Since 2003 he has worked in Končar as the manager of the organizational unit that produces the first Croatian laptops, and from 2005 to 2009 he has worked as the director of the Gradski parking d.o.o. in Šibenik where he became the double winner of the Employer's HR Excellence Partner (2008, 2009) and the awards like Winner of the Year, award in the category of public enterprises awarded by CROMA (Croatian Association of Managers and Entrepreneurs) (2008), and the Business Journal Lider has been among the top 250 young managers (2009).

As the state secretary of the Ministry of the Sea, Transport and Infrastructure, he is in charge of the period from 2010 to 2011, where he was also a member of the Council for Information Technology of the State Administration and member of the Board of the Republic of Croatia for Stabilization and Association. Since 2012 he has been the senior consultant for the area of energy efficiency and renewable energy sources of the Development Agency of the Šibenik-Knin County.

In the period between 2006 and 2012, Mileta was a member of the board of the High Technical School in his hometown, as well as a member of the club board of the dissolved water polo club VK Šibenik, member of the Supervisory Board of the Gradska čistoća d.o.o., president of the General Assembly of Croatia Airlines and the vice-president of the Croatian Parking Association.

Political career

In the 2013 local elections, after Željko Burić was elected as mayor of Šibenik, Mileta was appointed his deputy alongside Nikica Penđer, a Croatian Conservative Party politician. In the 2017 local elections, Burić was re-elected as mayor, and Mileta continued to hold the position, this time alongside Paško Rakić. 

In the 2021 Croatian local elections, Burić was elected mayor for the third time, with Mileta as his deputy.

Personal life 
He is married to Marijana Mileta, a former Yugoslav carate champion, with whom he has four children: Lucija, Toma, and twins Mare and Antea. He had enjoyed to play basketball in his youth.

References

Living people
1975 births
Croatian politicians
Croatian Democratic Union politicians
People from Šibenik
People from Šibenik-Knin County